Stabile is a surname derived from the medieval personal name Stabile (from Latin stabilis) and is mainly found among people from southern Italy. Notable people with the surname include:

 Annibale Stabile (1535–1595), Italian composer of the Roman School
 Guillermo Stábile (1905–1966), Argentine footballer and coach
 Mariano Stabile (1888–1968), Italian baritone
 Nick Stabile (born 1971), American actor

See also
 A type of abstract sculpture created by artist Alexander Calder
Italian-language surnames

Surnames of Sammarinese origin